Limonia nigropunctata is a species of fly from the genus Limonia. The species was originally described by Theodor Emil Schummel in 1829

References

Tipulidae
Insects described in 1829
Insects of Europe
Taxa named by Theodor Emil Schummel